The  are 13-digit identifiers assigned by the National Tax Agency to companies and other organizations registered in Japan. When filing tax returns or other forms related to taxation, employment or social insurance, assignees are required to print their own Corporate Number on the document.

Corporate Numbers were implemented in 2015, along with the 12-digit Individual Numbers, which identify individual residents (including resident aliens) in Japan. Unlike Individual Numbers, whose disclosure to the public is punishable, Corporate Numbers are published by the National Tax Agency.

Format 
A Corporate Number consists of 13 digits. The leading digit is a nonzero check digit calculated from the trailing 12 digits.

External links 
 Corporate Number Publication Site (by National Tax Agency)
 About the Corporate Number (Official introduction by National Tax Agency)
 Act on the Use of Numbers to Identify a Specific Individual in the Administrative Procedure (English translation of the legal text)

Taxation in Japan
2015 establishments in Japan